= Ginling Literary Awards =

Ginling Literary Awards is an award from Nanjing Provincial People's Government, is a literary creation award of the Nanjing city. The most early literary award of China, selection every three years since 1986.
